Taejo (Hangul: 태조, Hanja: 太祖), meaning "great ancestor", is a temple name often given to the founders of Korean dynasties, derived from the Chinese equivalent Tàizǔ. The term may refer to:

 Taejo of Goguryeo (47–165), born Go Gung, sixth monarch of Goguryeo
 Taejo of Goryeo (877–943), born Wang Geon, founder of Goryeo
 Taejo of Joseon (1335–1408), born Yi Seong-gye, founder of Joseon
 Taejo Togokhan, a character in the Speed Racer film adaptation

See also 
 Taizu (disambiguation) (Chinese version)

Temple name disambiguation pages

ko:태조
id:Taejo